Baboso is a remote peak near Veladero in the province of La Rioja (municipality of Vinchina) in the Argentine Puna de Atacama, with an elevation of  metres. The peak is also sometimes known as Veladero Northeast. The peak has one of the largest glaciers in the Puna de Atacama on its southern flank, and one of the few glaciers other than the ones on Monte Pissis to have open crevasses.

First ascent 
It was one of the last 6,000m+ peaks in the Andes to be climbed. Baboso was first climbed by John Biggar, Gordon Biggar, Peter Clarke, Peter Gilbert, Brian Powling, (UK) and Damian Aurelio Vargas (Peru) June 11th 2000. AAJ 1997 page 243 shows a previous ascent on 20/11/1996 when German del Rio and Jorge Llanos approached the peak on motorbikes. However, in an interview with John Biggar, he proved they did not reach the summit.

Elevation 
Other data from available digital elevation models: SRTM yields 6055 metres, ASTER 6069 metres and TanDEM-X 6097 metres. The height of the nearest key col is 5462 meters, leading to a topographic prominence of 608 meters. Baboso is considered a Mountain according to the Dominance System  and its dominance is 10.02%. Its parent peak is Bonete Chico and the Topographic isolation is 15.2 kilometers.

References

Mountains of Argentina
Volcanoes of La Rioja Province, Argentina
Six-thousanders of the Andes